Inti-Illimani (from Quechuan Inti and Aymara Illimani) are an instrumental and vocal Latin American folk music ensemble from Chile. The band was formed in 1967 by a group of university students and it acquired widespread popularity in Chile for their song Venceremos (We shall win!), which became the anthem of the Popular Unity government of Salvador Allende. At the moment of the 11 September, 1973 Chilean coup they were on tour in Europe and were unable to return to their country where their music was proscribed by the ruling military junta of Augusto Pinochet. In Europe their music took on a multifarious character, incorporating elements of European baroque and other traditional music forms to their rich and colourful Latin American rhythms, so creating a distinctive fusion of modern world music. They are perhaps the best internationally known members of the Nueva canción movement. Their name means 'Sun of the Illimani': Illimani, in Aymara language, is the name of a mountain in the Bolivian Andes and it means 'Golden Eagle'.

History
The group was formed by students at the Universidad Técnica del Estado at Santiago, Chile in 1967. In 1973 as they were on tour abroad, General Augusto Pinochet launched a coup d'etat and took power. Having heard of the numerous extra-judicial killings of many fellow artists by Chile's army, they took up residence in Italy, resulting in "the longest tour in history" for Inti-Illimani as they lived in de facto exile. They continued their efforts supporting Chilean democracy internationally; magnitizdat copies of their work continued to be widely distributed in Chile. In September 1988, days after they were no longer banned from Chile, they began touring Chile again, supporting the "No" side during the 1988 Chilean national plebiscite.

In the past the group was musically led by Horacio Salinas and politically led by Jorge Coulon. However, in 2001 there was a controversial split of the group, which started when three key members left the group (José Seves, Horacio Durán and Horacio Salinas). They were replaced by Manuel Meriño (from Entrama), Cristián González and Juan Flores. Due to the importance of departed members, many called into question the ability of the remainder to carry on the Inti-Illimani name. Meanwhile, the three departed members started their own group they call Inti-Illimani Histórico. From 2005 onwards, there are two groups:

Membership
In August 1967 Inti-Illimani's earliest membership consisted of:
Horacio Durán
Jorge Coulon
Luis Espinoza
Oscar Guzmán
Ciro Retamal
Pedro Yáñez

In 1968 Inti-Illimani's membership consisted of:
Horacio Salinas (Musical director and main composer)
Horacio Durán
Max Berrú
Jorge Coulon
Ernesto Perez de Arce

Current line-up of the "Inti-Illimani Nuevo":
Jorge Coulon
 Christian González
Daniel Cantillana
 Juan Flores
Efren Viera
Marcelo Coulon
Manuel Meriño
César Jara

Current line-up of the "Inti-Histórico":
Horacio Salinas
Horacio Durán
José Seves
Jorge Ball
Fernando Julio
Camilo Salinas
Danilo Donoso

Other members in the history of the group:

Ernesto Pérez de Arce
Homero Altamirano
José Miguel Camus
Renato Freyggang
Pedro Villagra

Discography
Albums
Si Somos Americanos (1969)
Voz para el camino (1969)
Por la CUT (1969)
A la Revolución Mexicana (1969)
Inti Illimani (1969)
Inti-Illimani (1970)
Canto al Programa (1970)
Charagua/El Aparecido (1971)
Autores Chilenos (1971)
Nuestro México, Febrero 23/Dolencias (1972)
Canto para una Semilla (1972)
Quebrada de Humahuaca/Taita Salasaca (1972)
Canto de Pueblos Andinos, Vol. 1 (1973)
Viva Chile! (1973)
La Nueva Canción Chilena (Inti-Illimani 2) (1974)
Canto de Pueblos Andinos (Inti-Illimani 3) (1975)
Hacia La Libertad (Inti-Illimani 4) (1975)
Canto de Pueblos Andinos, Vol. 2 (Inti-Illimani 5) (1976)
Chile Resistencia (Inti-Illimani 6) (1977)
Hart voor Chile (various artists) (1977)
Canto per una Seme (1978) – Italian edition of Canto para una Semilla (1972)
Canción para Matar una Culebra (1979)
Jag Vill Tacka Livet (Gracias a la Vida) (1980)
En Directo (1980)
Palimpsesto (1981)
The Flight of the Condor (1982)
Con la Razón y la Fuerza (1982)
Imaginación (1984)
Sing to me the Dream (1984)
Return of the Condor (1984)
La Muerte no Va Conmigo (1985)
De Canto y Baile (1986)
Fragmentos de un Sueño (1987)
Leyenda (1990)
Andadas (1992)
Arriesgaré la Piel (1996)
Grandes Exitos (1997)
Lejanía (1998)
Amar de Nuevo (1999)
Sinfónico (1999)
La Rosa de los Vientos (1999)
Inti-Illimani Interpreta a Víctor Jara (2000)
Antología en Vivo (2001)
Lugares Comunes (2002)

Inti-Illimani Histórico 
 2006 – Esencial
 2010 – Travesura (with Diego "el Cigala" and Ayllón )
 2013 – Inti Illimani Histórico – Vivir En Libertad
 2014 – Inti-Illimani Histórico Canta a Manns

Live albums 
 2005 – Inti + Quila Música en la memoria (with Quilapayún)
 2006 – Antología en vivo
 2006 – Música en la Memoria – Juntos en Chile (with Quilapayún)
 2012 – Eva + Inti (with Eva Ayllón)

Tribute albums 
 2009 – Inti-Illimani histórico. Tributo a su música
 2009 – Tributo a Inti-Illimani Histórico. A la Salud de la Música

Inti-Illimani Nuevo (New) 

2003 – Viva Italia
2006 – Pequeño Mundo 
2010 – Meridiano
2014 – Teoría de cuerdas

Contributing artist 
The Rough Guide to the Music of the Andes (1996, World Music Network)
Unwired: Latin America (2001, World Music Network)

See also
 El pueblo unido jamás será vencido

References

External links
Inti-Illimani on Twitter

Musical groups established in 1967
Chilean folk musical groups
Nueva canción musicians
Parlophone artists
Andean music